Blue Ridge Regional Airport  is nine miles southwest of Martinsville, in Henry County, Virginia. It is owned by the Blue Ridge Airport Authority. The FAA's National Plan of Integrated Airport Systems for 2009–2013 categorized it as a general aviation facility.

Many U.S. airports use the same three-letter location identifier for the FAA and IATA, but this airport is MTV to the FAA and has no IATA code (IATA says MTV is Mota Lava Airport in Mota Lava, Vanuatu).

Facilities
Its single runway, 12/30, is 5,002 by 100 feet (1,525 x 30 m) asphalt.

In the year ending June 30, 2007 the airport had 23,065 aircraft operations, average 63 per day: 97% general aviation, 3% air taxi, and <1% military. 60 aircraft were then based at the airport: 76.7% single-engine, 13.3% multi-engine, 3.3% jet, 3.3% helicopter and 3.3% glider.

References

External links 
 Blue Ridge Regional Airport, official website
 Aerial image as of 3 April 1996 from USGS The National Map
 

Airports in Virginia
Transportation in Henry County, Virginia
Buildings and structures in Henry County, Virginia